The Illusion of Motion is the third full-length album by the band YOB.

Critical reception
Exclaim! wrote that YOB "have outdone themselves on The Illusion of Motion, and despite the album title, [they] will finally gain loads of well-deserved momentum to make them the most talked-about doom band since Sleep." CMJ New Music Report praised the album's "sprawling heaviness."

Track listing

Personnel
Music
 Mike Scheidt - vocal, guitars
 Isamu Sato - bass
 Travis Foster - drums

Production
 Billy Barnett - mastering, mixing
 Mike Schiedt - mixing, mastering
 Jeff Olsen - audio engineer
 Isamu Sato - artwork, graphic design
 Jim Thompson - photography

References

Yob (band) albums
2004 albums